Home Sweet Home is a 1926 silent film drama starring Mahlon Hamilton and Vola Vale. It was directed and produced by independent John Gorman and distributed through Pathé Exchange.

It is preserved in the Library of Congress collection.

Cast
Mahlon Hamilton
Vola Vale
Hugh Allan (actor)
Lila Leslie
Lillian Gilmore -
Archie Burke -
Ervin Renard
J. D. Lockart -
Mildred Gregory -
S. D. Wilcox -

References

External links

1926 films
American silent feature films
1926 drama films
American black-and-white films
Silent American drama films
1920s American films